Leonidas Tsiklitiras was a Greek gymnast.  He competed at the 1896 Summer Olympics in Athens. Tsiklitiras competed in the horizontal bar event.  He did not win a medal, though his exact placement is unknown.

References

Year of birth missing
Year of death missing
Greek male artistic gymnasts
Gymnasts at the 1896 Summer Olympics
19th-century sportsmen
Olympic gymnasts of Greece
Place of birth missing
Place of death missing
Sportspeople from Patras